Sir Graham Frank James Bright (born 2 April 1942) is a British politician and businessman. A member of the Conservative Party, he served as a Member of Parliament (MP) from 1979 to 1997. He subsequently served as the Cambridgeshire Police and Crime Commissioner from 2012 to 2016.

Political career
An active Young Conservative, he cut his political teeth as a member of Thurrock Borough Council from 1965–79, and of Essex County Council from 1967–70. He stood unsuccessfully for Parliament in 1970 and 1974 in Thurrock, and in Dartford at the second general election of 1974, before being elected in Luton East in 1979. After constituency boundary changes, he transferred to Luton South at the 1983 general election, holding the seat until his defeat at the 1997 general election by Labour's Margaret Moran.

During his time in Parliament, Bright served as a Parliamentary Private Secretary (PPS) to various members of the Cabinet for 18 years, most notably to John Major for his first four years as Prime Minister (1990–94). Bright then went on to serve as a Vice-Chairman of the Conservative Party from 1994–97. He received a knighthood in 1994.

Bright introduced two Private Member's Bills to the House of Commons which became law. The first, introduced in 1983 was passed as the Video Recordings Act 1984 that required all commercial video recordings offered for sale or for hire within the UK to carry a classification.

The second, introduced in 1990 was the often referred to as the "Acid House [parties] Bill" became the Entertainments (Increased Penalties) Act 1990. In material relating to his candidature for Cambridgeshire's Police and Crime Commissioner Bright has described these Bills as being "aimed at protecting young people."

In September 2012 Bright was selected by the Conservative party to be their candidate in the election for Cambridgeshire's Police and Crime Commissioner. He won the election in November that year, and appointed his Party and business colleague Brian Ashton as his deputy which was criticised as potential favouritism. In December 2012, Bright called for a crackdown on "anti-social" and "dangerous" cyclists. In November 2013 he said that bicycle helmets should be compulsory.

Outside politics
Until he was 15, Bright was educated at Hassenbrook Secondary Modern School in Stanford-le-Hope. He later took courses at Thurrock Technical College. Outside politics, he worked as a marketing executive, factory manager and company director. He was chairman and chief executive of Dietary Foods Ltd for over 30 years.

Notes

External links 
 www.grahambright.com 
 

1942 births
Living people
Conservative Party (UK) MPs for English constituencies
UK MPs 1979–1983
UK MPs 1983–1987
Politics of Thurrock
UK MPs 1987–1992
UK MPs 1992–1997
Parliamentary Private Secretaries to the Prime Minister
Place of birth missing (living people)
Knights Bachelor
Police and crime commissioners in England
Politicians awarded knighthoods
Conservative Party police and crime commissioners
Conservative Party (UK) councillors
Members of Essex County Council